The Indian gerbil (Tatera indica) also known as antelope rat, is a species of rodent in the family Muridae.

It is found in southern Asia from Syria to Bangladesh.

It is the only species in the genus Tatera.  Members of the genus Gerbilliscus have historically been placed in Tatera.

Description
Head and body length is 17–20 cm. Tail is 20–21 cm. Dorsal surface including entire head is light brown or light brown with rusty wash. Underparts are white. Tail fully furred, dark blackish brown with grayish sides and prominent black tuft on tip. Fur on body soft, sparse underneath; tail fur is longer. Eyes are large and prominent. Bounding gait is distinguished when running.

Reproduction
Both the sexes of this species lives apart. The relation between male and female gerbils is not known yet.

Diet
Omnivorous. Known to eat grains, seeds, plants, roots, insects, reptiles and even small birds and mammals it can catch.

References

Other sources

Mammals described in 1807
Gerbils
Mammals of Afghanistan
Mammals of the Middle East
Mammals of Sri Lanka
Rodents of India
Rodents of Pakistan
Taxonomy articles created by Polbot